The 1st Canadian Comedy Awards honoured the best Canadian comedy of 1999 in live performances, television and film.  The awards ceremony was presented by the Canadian Comedy Foundation for Excellence (CCFE), and was held on 6 April 2000 at the Masonic Temple in Toronto, Ontario.  The ceremony was hosted by Dave Thomas.  A one-hour version of the ceremony was broadcast late the following night on CTV, and the full program aired on The Comedy Network on 9 April at 9 pm.

Canadian Comedy Awards, also known as Beavers, were awarded in 23 categories. Winners were selected by members of ACTRA (Alliance of Canadian Cinema, Television and Radio Artists), the Canadian Actors' Equity Association, the Writers Guild of Canada, and the Directors Guild of Canada. It was one of the first award presentations to use online voting. The ceremony also marked the creation of the Canadian Comedy Hall of Fame and the induction of its first honourees.

The Drowsy Chaperone and the CBC comedy Made in Canada led the way with six nominations each, followed by Double Exposure, Last Night, and This Hour Has 22 Minutes with five.  The big winners were This Hour Has 22 Minutes which won four awards in television, The Drowsy Chaperone which took three awards in live comedy, and Mike Myers who won three in film. Don McKellar won two awards across disciplines: best film director for Last Night and best playwright (together with colleagues Bob Martin, Lisa Lambert and Greg Morrison) for The Drowsy Chaperone.

Ceremony

The inaugural Canadian Comedy Awards ceremony was held on 6 April 2000 in Toronto, Ontario. The venue was the historic Masonic Temple, home of CTV-affiliate The Comedy Network. The ceremony was hosted by Dave Thomas, a comedic veteran of more than 20 films and 300 sitcom episodes. Thomas is best known for the character Doug McKenzie, a parody of all things Canadian, and the ceremony played on similar humour by serving guests back bacon on a bun and poutine.

Awards
The Beaver was awarded in twenty-three categories recognizing work in live performances, film and television. Winners are listed first and highlighted in boldface:

Live

Television

Film

Special Awards

Multiple wins
The following people, shows, films, etc. received multiple awards in the inaugural ceremony:

Multiple nominations
The following people, shows, films, etc. received multiple nominations.

Broadcast

The awards ceremony was held in Toronto's Masonic Temple, which CTV Television Network had equipped as a television studio in the late 1990s.  The ceremony was recorded for television, produced by Higher Ground Productions and directed by Bob Sorger. A one-hour version of the ceremony was broadcast on CTV at midnight on the night of Friday 7 April 2000, with the full program airing on The Comedy Network on 9 April at 9 pm.  The special was well received by the members of the industry it represents, who awarded Sorger the Beaver for best direction of a TV special or episode in 2001.

References

External links
Canadian Comedy Awards official website

Canadian Comedy Awards
Canadian Comedy Awards
Awards
Awards
1999 awards in Canada